This article is a list of prominent members and supporters of the Unification movement, founded by Sun Myung Moon.

Moon family 
The family of Rev. Moon and his wife Hak Ja Han are known as the "True Family". Rev. and Mrs. Moon are known as "True Father" and "True Mother" within the movement, and collectively as the "True Parents." Their children are known as the "True Children."

 Rev. Sun Myung Moon (1920–2012) – founder and leader of the Unification movement.
 Hak Ja Han – founder's wife and current leader of the Unification movement. They were married in 1960.
 Heung Jin Moon (1966–1984) second son, died in auto accident, believed by members to be leading workshops in the spiritual world in which spirits of deceased persons are taught Unification movement teachings.
 In Jin Moon second daughter, former president of the Unification Church of the United States.
 Julia Moon – widow (posthumous wedding) of Heung Jin Moon. Born Hoon Sook Pak, oldest daughter of long time major leader and key aide Bo Hi Pak. General Director and former prima ballerina of Universal Ballet, South Korea.
 Moon Kook-jin – fourth son; also known as Justin Moon. Businessman and firearms designer. Owns and operates Kahr Arms, a U.S. small arms manufacturer, former chairman of Tongil Group, a South Korean chaebol associated with the Unification movement.
 Hyun Jin "Preston" Moon (born 25 May 1969) - South Korean social entrepreneur, founder and chairman of the Global Peace Foundation, and later the Family Peace Association. 
 Hyung Jin “Sean” Moon (born 1979) – youngest son, pastor and co-founder of Pennsylvania-based, unofficial militant offshoot, World Peace and Unification Sanctuary, also known as Rod of Iron Ministries, former president of international Unification movement, studied theology at Harvard Extension University.

Unification movement members 
Ek Nath Dhakal, Nepalese politician.
 Mose Durst – President of the Unification Church of the United States in the 1980s, author, educator.
 Dan Fefferman – Executive Director of the International Coalition for Religious Freedom.
 Patrick Hickey – Nevada state legislator and author of Tahoe Boy: A Journey Back Home, his autobiography which told of his experiences as a movement leader and of his marriage to a Korean woman introduced to him by Moon.
 Nansook Hong – Ex-wife of Hyo Jin Moon and ex-member of the organization. Author of book about her experiences, In the Shadow of the Moons: My Life in the Reverend Sun Myung Moon's Family.
 Frank Kaufmann – Comparative religion scholar; editor of journal Dialogue and Alliance; IRFWP director
Young Oon Kim (1914–1989) was a leading theologian of the Unification movement and its first missionary to the United States.
 Chung Hwan Kwak – Former chairman and president of United Press International and of News World Communications, Inc.; former leader of many other Unification-affiliated organizations.   Now Honorary President of the Global Peace Foundation. 
 Tom McDevitt – President of The Washington Times, from 2007 to 2009. Unification movement spokesperson, and pastor in the Washington, D.C. region.
 Bo Hi Pak (1930−2019) — Founding chairman and president of The Washington Times; main translator (during the 70s and 80s) for Rev. Moon's speeches given to English speaking audiences. Author of Messiah, a biography of Sun Myung Moon.
 Junko Sakurada (桜田 淳子) – Singer and actress.
 Neil Albert Salonen – Former president of the Unification Church of the United States and of the University of Bridgeport.
 Lee Shapiro (1949–1987) – Documentary filmmaker, died while filming in Afghanistan in 1987, during the Soviet–Afghan War.
 Josette Sheeran – Vice Chairman of the World Economic Forum, formerly Executive Director of the United Nations World Food Programme and journalist and editor of The Washington Times.
Kevin Thompson – Pastor of the Bay Area Family Church, a Unification movement congregation located in San Leandro, California.
 Jonathan Wells – Author of Icons of Evolution: Science or Myth? and senior fellow of the Discovery Institute's Center for Science and Culture.
 Andrew Wilson – Professor at Unification Theological Seminary; editor of World Scripture: A Comparative Anthology of Sacred Texts.

Supporters 
These are some people well-known for their support of the Unification movement.
Ralph Abernathy, minister, civil rights leader, served as vice president of the Unification movement-affiliated group American Freedom Coalition, and served on two Unification movement boards of directors.
Neil Bush, businessman, son of United States president George H. W. Bush and brother of president George W. Bush, promoted Moon at events in Asia and the United States.
Danny K. Davis, United States congressman co-sponsored a 2004 ceremony in which Moon was crowned the "King of Peace."
Louis Farrakhan, the leader of The Nation of Islam, an African American Islamic organization, served as a "co-officiator" at a Blessing ceremony of the Unification Church.  In 2000 the Unification movement co-sponsored the Million Family March, a rally in Washington D.C. to celebrate family unity and racial and religious harmony, along with the Nation of Islam. Farrakhan was the main speaker at the event.
Morton Kaplan, author and University of Chicago professor of political science. Editor of Unification movement owned The World & I magazine and organizer of movement sponsored conferences.
Kim Chong Pil, South Korean politician and founder of the Korean Central Intelligence Agency (KCIA), supported the movement's political activism in the United States.
Nobusuke Kishi, Japanese politician and Prime Minister (1957 to 1960),  had longstanding ties to the Unification Church Kishi's postwar political agenda led him to help set up the Unification Church in Japan in 1963.
Douglas MacArthur II, American diplomat. Chairman of the World Media Association and member of the editorial advisory board of the Washington Times.
Emmanuel Milingo, now excommunicated Roman Catholic archbishop, married by Moon in 2001 to Unification movement member and supporter of Unification movement projects.
Richard L. Rubenstein, author and educator. Appointed by Moon as president of the University of Bridgeport.
Ryoichi Sasakawa, Japanese businessman and philanthropist. Supported Moon’s anti-communist work in Asia.
Ninian Smart (1927–2001), Scottish author and professor at University of Lancaster and University of California at Santa Barbara. President of the American Academy of Religion. Supported the Inter Religious Federation for World Peace, the International Conference on the Unity of the Sciences and other Unification movement affiliated projects.
George Augustus Stallings, Jr., former Roman Catholic priest. Organized Washington, D.C. coronation of Moon. Married by Moon.
Peter Tapsell, former Speaker of the New Zealand House of Representatives. In 2006, he sponsored the Unification movement organization Universal Peace Federation in New Zealand and spoke at a rally with Mrs. Moon.
Donald Trump, real estate investor and President of the United States (2017-2021) gave speeches at an event hosted by an affiliate of the Unification Church supporting Han's leadership and calling for Korean reunification.

References 

Unification Church